Leverhulme Medal may refer to:
Leverhulme Medal (Royal Society), awarded by the Royal Society
Leverhulme Medal (British Academy), awarded by the British Academy